Posht Darb may refer to:
 Posht Darb-e Olya
 Posht Darb-e Sofla
 Posht Darb-e Vosta